The Men's scratch event of the 2009 UCI Track Cycling World Championships was held on 26 March 2009.

Results

References

External links
 Full results at tissottiming.com

Men's scratch
UCI Track Cycling World Championships – Men's scratch